Selma Urfer (born 30 March 1928 in Bern, Switzerland; died 2 May 2013 in Munich) was a Swiss author, translator and actress. She graduated from the Zurich School of Drama in 1948. In addition to acting and studio recordings, she published numerous short stories, radio and TV plays, translations from French/English and two novels. She joined the Gruppe Olten in 1970. She was married to the German actor Robert Graf, had three children, including German film director Dominik Graf, and lived in Munich.

Awards 

 1984 - Preis des Kurzgeschichtenwettbewerbs des Schweizerischen Beobachters
 1985 - Literaturpreis des C. Bertelsmann Verlags
 1987 - Literaturpreis des Kantons Bern

Works 

 Damals. Dort., C. Bertelsmann Verlag, Munich 1986 
 Skizzen aus Grandson, Les Editions d'Autrefois, Grandson 1988
 Liebe in Coppet. Eine Erinnerung an Madame de Staël, Nymphenburger Verlagsanstalt, 1992 
 Der braune Eisbär, Schweiz. Jugendschriftenwerk, 2005
 Peter Pan in Kensington Gardens, translation into German from the novel The Little White Bird (1902) by James Matthew Barrie, English and German parallel texts, with notes and afterword, Scaneg Verlag, Munich 2008

References

External links

Scriptwriter for TV play, Der unwürdige Liebhaber, together with Heinrich Ost
Entry in lexicon of Swiss authors
 Entry in Kürschners Deutscher Literatur-Kalender, 66. Jahrgang 2008/2009, K.G.Saur Verlag Munich, 

1928 births
2013 deaths
People from Bern
Swiss television actresses
Swiss writers
Swiss voice actresses
Swiss stage actresses